Treehouse is a 2014 American horror film directed by Michael Bartlett, written by  Alex Child and Miles Harrington, and starring J. Michael Trautmann, Dana Melanie, Daniel Fredrick, and Clint James.  Teens attempt to escape a treehouse back to the safety of their town after going out after a curfew.

Plot 
After several children go missing, a Missouri town institutes a curfew.  Brothers Killian and Crawford disobey the curfew and discover Elizabeth, one of the missing children, hiding in a treehouse. As the teens became aware that they are being stalked, they attempt to return to town safely.

Cast 
 J. Michael Trautmann as Killian
 Dana Melanie as Elizabeth
 Daniel Fredrick as Crawford
 Clint James as Killian's father
 Victoria Spencer Smith as Killian's mom
 Nick Herra as The Tall One
 Shannon Knopke as Marsha
 Darren Kennedy as Officer Morgan
 Caleb Cox as Tyler

Production 
Bartlett, a native of the UK, moved to Missouri, where he shot Treehouse.  Bartlett said that he was attracted to the script due to its atmosphere and originality.  Bartlett did a complete rewrite after optioning the script.  Elizabeth was based on his own wife.  The initial budget was $1 million, and they worked to decrease costs below that.  The shoot was planned to last 19 days.  Impressed with The Signal and its fast shooting schedule, Bartlett sought out that film's director of photography, but unforeseen circumstances, including an influenza outbreak, caused shooting to extend to 30 days.  Bartlett and original scriptwriter Child were heavily involved in casting.

Release 
The theatrical premiere was at the St. Louis International Film Festival on November 16, 2014.  After technical issues with the film's screening, Bartlett told the audience that they should illegally download the film from the Internet in order to get their money's worth.  It was released on DVD in the UK on October 20, 2014, and on video on demand on February 20, 2015.  It also played in Los Angeles on the same date.

Reception 
Gary Goldstein of the Los Angeles Times called it "a lackluster backwoods thriller" lacks the tension of Jeopardy!.  Dan Gvozden        of LA Weekly said that the film initially builds suspense but ultimately unravels due to the characters' "cringe-worthy dialogue" and "unlikely decisions mandated by plot rather than character".  Ryan Pollard of Starburst rated it 8/10 stars and wrote, "In the end, while there are inadequate faults with the script and some ungainly performances, Treehouse overcomes its flaws with its core aesthetic, visceral atmosphere, Dana Melanie's towering performance, and ultimately delivering on its promise to scare the pants off you."  Michael Gingold of Fangoria rated it 2.5/4 stars and criticized Bartlett's rewrite of the script as changing the film's tone and contradicting what has gone on before, though he praised the film's tension.  Patrick Cooper of Bloody Disgusting rated it 3.5/5 stars and called it "a brooding, atmospheric thriller that works on a lot of levels".  Scott Hallam of Dread Central rated it 3.5/5 stars and wrote, "If you're looking for a tense and creepy night at the movies, give Treehouse a look."

See also

 2014 in film
 List of American films of 2014
 List of British films of 2014
 Treehouse (Into the Dark) 2019

References

Further reading

Interviews

External links 
 
 

2014 films
2014 horror films
2014 horror thriller films
American teen horror films
American independent films
American horror thriller films
Films set in Missouri
Films shot in Missouri
2014 independent films
2010s English-language films
2010s American films